The Phantom Thief is a 1946 American crime film directed by D. Ross Lederman. The film follows detective Boston Blackie as he tries to track down a blackmailer-murderer. As the investigation goes on, a supernatural element becomes clear.

Cast
 Chester Morris as Horatio 'Boston Blackie' Black
 Jeff Donnell as Anne Parks Duncan
 Richard Lane as Inspector John Farraday
 Dusty Anderson as Sandra
 George E. Stone as The Runt
 Frank Sully as Detective Sergeant Matthews
 Marvin Miller as Dr. Nejino
 Wilton Graff as Rex Duncan
 Murray Alper as Eddie Alexander, Chauffeur
 Forbes Murray as Dr. Purcell Nash
 Joseph Crehan as 'Jumbo' Madigan - Pawnbroker

References

External links
 
 
 
 

1946 films
1940s crime films
1940s supernatural films
American crime films
American detective films
American supernatural films
American black-and-white films
1940s English-language films
Films directed by D. Ross Lederman
Columbia Pictures films
Boston Blackie films
1940s American films